Johannes Nicholas Malan, better known as Nico Malan, was an attorney, politician and Administrator of the Province of the Cape of Good Hope (South Africa), 1960-1970. He was born on 8 August 1903 in Fort Beaufort, Cape Colony, and died there in 1981.

The Nico Malan Theatre Complex in Cape Town, now known as the Artscape Theatre Centre, was named in his honour. A school in Humansdorp, Eastern Cape, is also named after him (Hoërskool Nico Malan High School).

In 1968, Dr. J. N. Malan received the Freedom of the City of Kimberley.

References

Provincial political office-holders in South Africa
1903 births
1981 deaths